Gert Joubert (born 1948 in Mowbray, Cape Town) is a Namibian businessperson. Joubert was born in South Africa but moved to Namibia during the 1960s. While in university, Joubert was followed as a suspected communist by the secret police of the apartheid regime until he approached the police and explained his support for capitalism. Joubert began his business career as a cattle entrepreneur near Otjiwarongo. In  2000, he ventured into eco-tourism and owns the Erindi Game Reserve near Omaruru in the Erongo Region.

References

1948 births
Living people
Namibian businesspeople
People from Cape Town
People from Otjiwarongo
South African emigrants to Namibia
Tourism in Namibia